threo-3-Hydroxy-D-aspartate ammonia-lyase (EC 4.3.1.27, D-threo-3-hydroxyaspartate dehydratase) is an enzyme with systematic name threo-3-hydroxy-D-aspartate ammonia-lyase (oxaloacetate-forming). This enzyme catalyses the following chemical reaction

 threo-3-hydroxy-D-aspartate  oxaloacetate + NH3

This enzyme is a pyridoxal-phosphate protein.

References

External links 
 

EC 4.3.1